Prince Krzysztof Radziwiłł (Christopher Radvila) (22 March 1585, Biržai – 19 November 1640) was a Polish–Lithuanian noble (szlachcic), and a notable magnate, politician and military commander of his epoch. Sometimes referred to as Krzysztof Radziwiłł II, to distinguish him from his father, Krzysztof Mikołaj 'Piorun' Radziwłł.

Biography
Owner of Biržai, he was Field Hetman of Lithuania from 1615, Castellan of Vilnius from 1633, Voivode of Vilnius Voivodeship from 1633,. Great Lithuanian Hetman from 1635,. starost of Mahilyow, Bystrzyca, Žiežmariai and Seje. In 1632 he served as Marshal of the Sejm.

He successfully fought in Lithuanian Livonia against Sweden from 1600s to 1617. He took part in the campaign against the Swedes in the Baltic region in 1621–1622 (Polish-Swedish War), where he agreed to a controversial truce (as he had no permission to negotiate it from the king or the Sejm). Important commander of Lithuanian forces during the Smolensk War, where he was instrumental in obtaining the capitulation of the Russian army in the relief of Smolensk.  Afterwards, in 1635, he retired from his military career, concentrating on administering his estates. A Calvinist, he was a great protector of Protestants in Lithuania.

He was an opponent of Catholic king Sigismund III Vasa, but a supporter of his more tolerant son, Władysław IV. An advocate of Władysław's marriage to a Protestant princess, he distanced himself from the king after Władysław declined this marriage proposal. He opposed an alliance between the Commonwealth and the Habsburgs. On his lands in Kėdainiai he founded a major Calvinist cultural and religious centre, which flourished till the 19th century as a center of the Lithuanian Reformed Church. His large horse stables were famous throughout Europe.

Collector
Radziwiłł collected various curiosities at the Lubcha Castle: minerals, mollusc shells, corals, hunting trophies, whale bones, elephant tusk, nut shells, and similar items. It is believed that at least three items (moose horn collection, a chair made of horns, and a jaw bone of bowhead whale) of the collection are preserved at the Zoological Museum of Vilnius University.

References

External link

1585 births
1640 deaths
People from Biržai
Secular senators of the Polish–Lithuanian Commonwealth
Lithuanian Calvinist and Reformed Christians
Polish Calvinist and Reformed Christians
Krzysztof
Polish people of the Polish–Muscovite War (1605–1618)
Polish people of the Smolensk War
Field Hetmans of the Grand Duchy of Lithuania
Great Hetmans of the Grand Duchy of Lithuania
Voivode of Vilnius
17th-century Polish landowners